Jordan's chimaera (Chimaera jordani) is a species of fish in the family Chimaeridae found near Japan, Madagascar, and Mozambique. Its natural habitat is open seas.

References

Chimaera
Taxonomy articles created by Polbot
Fish described in 1905